Props Inc, founded in 1985 by Jeff Bertuleit, is an American manufacturer of wooden propellers for homebuilt and ultralight aircraft. The company headquarters is located in Newport, Oregon.

The company has produced over 3000 propellers for a wide range of engines, including Lycoming, Continental, Rotax, Rotec, Hirth, Jabiru and Volkswagen air-cooled engines.

See also
List of aircraft propeller manufacturers

References

External links 

Companies established in 1985
Aircraft propeller manufacturers
Aerospace companies of the United States
Newport, Oregon
Privately held companies based in Oregon
1985 establishments in Oregon